Mostafa Chatrabgoon (born January 6, 1987) is an Iranian football player. He plays for the Azadegan League club Mes Rafsanjan as a striker.

Club career
A product of the Pas Tehran's youth system, Chatrabgoon was drafted into the first team for the 2006–07 season. At the end of the season as Pas Tehran officially dissolved, he moved to Pas Hamedan along with other team members.

Club career statistics

 Assist Goals

International career
Mostafa Chatrabgoon was a member of Iran national under-20 football team at the 2006 AFC Youth Championship. He was also with Iran national under-23 football team, competing in the qualification games for the 2008 Summer Olympics.

External links
Persian League Profile

Iranian footballers
Association football midfielders
Pas players
1987 births
Living people
Gostaresh Foulad F.C. players
People from Kashan